Julia Golding (born 1969), pen names Joss Stirling and Eve Edwards, is a British novelist best known for her Cat Royal series and The Companions Quartet.

Biography
Born in London, 1969, she grew up on the edge of Epping Forest. She originally read English at the University of Cambridge. She then joined the Foreign Office and worked in Poland. Her work as a diplomat took her many places including the Tatra Mountains and the bottom of a Silesian coal mine.

Upon leaving Poland, she turned her attention to academic studies and took a doctorate in English Romantic Period literature at Oxford University. She then worked for Oxfam as a lobbyist on conflict issues, campaigning at the United Nations and with governments to lessen the impact of conflict on civilians living in war zones.

Golding lives in Oxford and works as a freelance writer. She is married with three children. The Diamond of Drury Lane is her first novel, the first of the Cat Royal series. 

In 2007 Waterstones selected her as one of 25 Authors of the Future.

Published books

Novel series
Cat Royal
 The Diamond of Drury Lane (Egmont, 2006)
 Cat among the Pigeons (2006)
 Den of Thieves (2007)
 Cat O'Nine Tails (2007)
 Black Heart of Jamaica (2008)
 The Middle Passage (novella, 2012)
 Cat's Cradle (2009)

The Companions Quartet
 Secret of the Sirens (Oxford University Press, 2006)
 The Gorgon's Gaze (2006)
 Mines of the Minotaur (2007)
 The Chimera's Curse (2007)

Darcie Lock
Ringmaster (2007)
Empty Quarter (2008)
Deadlock (2011)

Dragonfly Universe
 Dragonfly (Oxford, 2008)
 The Glass Swallow (2010)
 Ragged Wolf (2019)

Universal Companions
The Water Thief (2011)

Young Knights
 Young Knights of the Round Table (Oxford, 2013)
 Pendragon (2013)
 Merlin (2014)

Mel Foster
Mel Foster and the Demon Butler (2015) - Victorian fantasy
Mel Foster and the Time Machine (2016)

Others by Julia Golding

 The Ship Between the Worlds (Oxford, 2007) – pirate fantasy
 Wolf Cry (Oxford, 2009); US edition, The Silver Sea (Marshall Cavendish, 2010) – historical YA novel about Vikings

As Joss Stirling
Savants
 Finding Sky Trilogy
 Finding Sky (Oxford, 2010)
 Stealing Phoenix (2011)
 Seeking Crystal (2012)
 Challenging Zed (2013) 
 Misty Falls (2014)
 Angel Dares (2015)
 Burning Yves (2015)
 Summer Shadows (2016)
Raven Stone or Young Detectives
 Storm and Stone (Oxford, 2014); e-edition, Struck
 Stung (2015)
 Shaken (2016)
 Scorched (2017)

As Eve Edwards
The Lacey Chronicles, set in the Elizabethan age
The Other Countess (Penguin, 2010)
The Queen's Lady (2011)
The Rogue's Princess (2011)
World War I duet
 Dusk: a love worth fighting for (Penguin, 2013)
 Dawn: a love worth living for (2014)

Other writing 
Julia Golding is contributing to Mystery & Mayhem by Egmont Books, published in May 2016 along with 11 other authors including Katherine Woodfine, Clementine Beauvais, Elen Caldecott, Susie Day, Frances Hardinge, Caroline Lawrence, Helen Moss, Sally Nicholls, Kate Pankhurst, Robin Stevens and Harriet Whitehorn.

Awards and nominations

2006 - The Diamond of Drury Lane won the Waterstones Children's Book Prize
2006 - The Diamond of Drury Lane won the Nestlé Smarties Book Prize in the 9–11 years old category
2006 - The Diamond of Drury Lane was shortlisted for the Costa Book Awards
2008 - Secrets of the Sirens won the Green Earth Book Award (Honour book)

References

External links
 
 Julia Golding at Fantastic Fiction
 

1969 births
British children's writers
British fantasy writers
English women novelists
British chick lit writers
Date of birth missing (living people)
Living people
British women children's writers
Women science fiction and fantasy writers